This is an alphabetical list of composers from Germany.

A
 Ludwig Abeille (1761–1838)
 Carl Friedrich Abel (1723–1787)
 Clamor Heinrich Abel (1634–1696)
 Ludwig Abel (1835–1895)
 Otto Abel (1905–1977)
 Walter Abendroth (1896–1973)
 Franz Abt (1819–1885)
 Anton Cajetan Adlgasser (1729–1777)
 Theodor Ludwig Wiesengrund Adorno (1903–1969)
 Johan Agrell (1701–1765)
 Johann Friedrich Agricola (1720–1774)
 Martin Agricola (1486–1556)
 Carl Christian Agthe (1762–1797)
 Johann Georg Ahle (1651–1706)
 Johann Gottfried Arnold (1773–1806)
 Johann Rudolph Ahle (1625–1673)
 Joseph Ahrens (1904–1997)
 Sieglinde Ahrens (born 1936)
 Johann Caspar Aiblinger (1779–1867)
 Bartholomäus Aich (17th Century)
 Gregor Aichinger (1565–1628)
 Eugen d'Albert (1864–1932)
 Heinrich Albert (1604–1651)
 Giovanni Henrico Albicastro (c. 1660 – 1730), born Johann Heinrich von Weissenburg
 Christoph Albrecht (1930–2016)
 Leni Alexander (1924–2005)
 Johann Ernst Altenburg (1734–1801)
 Michael Altenburg (1584–1640)
 Johann Christoph Altnikol (1720–1759)
 Anna Amalia, Princess of Prussia (1723–1787)
 Johann André (1741–1799)
 Johann Anton André (1775–1842)
 Franz Joseph Antony 1790–1837
 Anna Amalia, Duchess of Brunswick-Wolfenbüttel (1739–1807)
 Amalie Auguste, Princess Amalie of Saxony (1794–1870)
 Johannes Aulen (late 15th century)

B
 August Wilhelm Bach (1796–1869)
 Carl Philipp Emanuel Bach (1714–1788)
 Heinrich Bach (1615–1692)
 Johann(es) ("Hans") Bach III. (1604–1673)
 Johann Aegidius Bach I. (1645–1716)
 Johann Ambrosius Bach (1644–1695)
 Johann Bernhard Bach (1676–1749)
 Johann Bernhard Bach (the younger) (1700–1743)
 Johann Christian Bach (1735–1782)
 Johann Christoph Bach (the elder) (1645–1693)
 Johann Christoph Friedrich Bach (1732–1795)
 Johann Ernst Bach II (1722–1777)
 Johann Ludwig Bach (1677–1731)
 Johann Lorenz Bach (1695–1773)
 Johann Nikolaus Bach (1669–1753)
 Johann Sebastian Bach (1685–1750)
 Wilhelm Friedemann Bach (1710–1784
 Wilhelm Friedrich Ernst Bach (1759–1845)
 Heinrich Backofen (1768–1830)
 Selmar Bagge (1823–1896)
 Woldemar Bargiel (1828–1892)
 Ernst Gottlieb Baron (1696–1760)
 Friedrich Baumfelder (1836–1916)
 Jürg Baur (1918–2010)
 Waldemar von Baußnern (1866–1931)
 Franz Ignaz Beck (1734–1809)
 Hugo Becker (1863–1941)
 Ignaz von Beecke (1733–1803)
 Anton Beer-Walbrunn (1864–1929)
 Ludwig van Beethoven (1770–1827)
 Franz Benda (1709–1786)
 Georg Anton Benda (1722–1795)
 Jean Berger (1909–2002)
 Wilhelm Berger (1861–1911)
 Christoph Bernhard (1628–1692)
 Frank Michael Beyer (1928–2008)
 Johann Samuel Beyer (1669–1744)
 Günter Bialas (1907–1995)
 Franz Biebl (1906–2001)
 Michael von Biel (born 1937)
 Helmut Bieler (1940–2019)
 Benjamin Bilse (1816–1902)
 Boris Blacher (1903–1975)
 Oskar Gottlieb Blarr (born 1934)
 Leo Blech (1871–1958)
 Theodor Blumer (1881–1964)
 Martin Blumner (1827–1901)
 Erhard Bodenschatz (1576–1639)
 Georg Böhm (1661–1733)
 Siegfried Borris (1906–1987)
 Hans-Jürgen von Bose (born 1953)
 Thomas Böttger (born 1957)
 Johannes Brahms (1833–1897)
 Caspar Joseph Brambach (1833–1902)
 Theo Brandmüller (1948–2012)
 Nikolaus Brass (born 1949)
 Walter Braunfels (1882–1954)
 Reiner Bredemeyer (1929–1995)
 Wolfgang Carl Briegel (1626–1712)
 Max Bruch (1838–1920)
 Klaus Bruengel (born 1949)
 Nicolaus Bruhns (1665–1697)
 Karl Gottfried Brunotte (born 1958)
 Thomas Buchholz (born 1961)
 Philipp Friedrich Buchner (1614–1669)
 Fritz Büchtger (1903–1978)
 Hans von Bülow (1830–1894)
 August Bungert (1845–1915)
 Friedrich Burgmüller (1806–1874)
 Norbert Burgmüller (1810–1836)
 Adolf Busch (1891–1952)
 Max Butting (1888–1976)
 Johann Heinrich Buttstedt (1666–1727)
 Dietrich Buxtehude (1637–1707)

C
 Sethus Calvisius (1556–1615)
 Christian Cannabich (1731–1798)
 August Conradi (1821–1873)
 Peter Cornelius (1824–1874)

D
 Franz Danzi (1763–1826)
 Ferdinand David (1810–1871)
 Johann Nepomuk David (1895–1977)
 Constantin Christian Dedekind (1628–1715)
 Michael Denhoff (born 1955)
 Ratko Delorko (born 1959)
 Christoph Demantius (1567–1643)
 Paul Dessau (1894–1979)
 Felix Otto Dessoff (1835–1892)
 Albert Dietrich (1829–1908)
 Hugo Distler (1908–1942)
 Ramin Djawadi (born 1974)
 Johann Friedrich Doles (1715–1797)
 Heinrich Dorn (1804–1892)
 Justus Johann Friedrich Dotzauer (1783–1860)
 Felix Draeseke (1835–1913)
 Annette von Droste-Hülshoff (1797–1848)
 Philipp Dulichius (1562–1631)

E
 Johann Georg Ebeling (1637–1676)
 Johann Ernst Eberlin (1702–1762)
 Traugott Maximilian Eberwein (1775–1831)
 Johannes Eccard (1553–1611)
 Moritz Eggert (born 1965)
 Werner Egk (1901–1983)
 Ernst Eichner (1740–1777), also known as Ernst Dietrich Adolph Eichner, Ernesto Eichner
 Hanns Eisler (1898–1962)
 Elisabeth Sophie of Mecklenburg (1613–1676)
 Philipp Heinrich Erlebach (1657–1714)
 Caspar Ett (1788–1847)

F
 Hans Fährmann (1860–1940)
 Immanuel Faißt (1823–1894)
 Carl Friedrich Christian Fasch (1736–1800)
 Johann Friedrich Fasch (1688–1758)
 Reinhard Febel (born 1952)
 Alexander von Fielitz (1860–1930)
 Anton Fils (1733–1760)
 Gottfried Wilhelm Fink (1783–1846)
 Siegfried Fink (1928–2006)
 Johann Fischer (1646–1716)
 Johann Caspar Ferdinand Fischer (1556–1656)
 Johann Christian Fischer (1733–1800)
 Johann Karl Christian Fischer (1752–1807)
 Johann Friedrich Anton Fleischmann (1766–1798)
 Christian Flor (1629–1697)
 Friedrich von Flotow (1812–1883)
 Johann Nikolaus Forkel (1749–1818)
 Christoph Förster (1693–1745)
 Wolfgang Fortner (1907–1987)
 Eduard Franck (1817–1893)
 Johann Wolfgang Franck (1644–c.1710)
 Melchior Franck (1580–1639)
 Richard Franck (1858–1938)
 Clemens von Franckenstein (1875–1942)
 Bernd Franke (born 1959)
 Robert Franz (1815–1892)
 Frederick II of Prussia (1712–1786)
 Carl Friedemann (1862–1952)
 Johannes Fritsch (1941–2010)
 Johann Jakob Froberger (1616–1667)
 Adam von Fulda (1445–1505)
 Wilhelm Furtwängler (1886–1954)

G
 Florian Leopold Gassmann (1729–1774)
 Fritz Geißler (1921–1984)
 Harald Genzmer (1909–2007)
 Hans Gerle (c. 1498 – 1570)
 Friedrich Gernsheim (1839–1916)
 Ottmar Gerster (1897–1969)
 Franz Gleißner (1761–1818)
 Michael Gielen (1927–2019)
 Christoph Willibald Gluck (1714–1787)
 Hermann Goetz (1840–1876)
 Walter Wilhelm Goetze (1883–1961)
 Friedrich Goldmann (1941–2009)
 Berthold Goldschmidt (1903–1996)
 Paul Graener (1872–1944)
 Christian Ernst Graf (1723–1804)
 Friedrich Hartmann Graf (1727–1795)
 Johann Graf (1684–1750)
 Carl Heinrich Graun (1704–1759)
 Kurt Graunke (1915–2005)
 Johann Gottlieb Graun (1703–1771)
 Christoph Graupner (1683–1760)
 Eduard Grell (1800–1886)
 Franz Grothe (1908–1982)
 Gallus Guggumos (c. 1590 – c. 1666)
 Gustav Gunsenheimer (born 1934)
 Manfred Gurlitt (1890–1972)

H
 Joseph Haas (1879–1960)
 Bernhard Joachim Hagen (1720–1787)
 Peter Michael Hamel (born 1947)
 Stefan Hakenberg (born 1960)
 Andreas Hakenberger (1574–1627)
 August Halm (1869–1929)
 Peter Michael Hamel (born 1947)
 George Frideric Handel (1685–1759)
 Heinz Friedrich Hartig (1907–1969)
 Karl Amadeus Hartmann (1905–1963)
 Ludwig Hartmann (1836–1910)
 Johann Adolph Hasse (1699–1783)
 Karl Hasse (1883–1960)
 Hans Leo Hassler (1546–1612)
 Jakob Hassler (1569–1622)
 Johann Wilhelm Häßler (1747–1822)
 Carl August Haupt (1810–1891)
 Moritz Hauptmann (1792–1868)
 Florian Havemann (born 1952)
 Joseph Haydn (1732–1809)
 Pantaleon Hebenstreit (1668–1750)
 Werner Heider (born 1930)
 Johann David Heinichen (1683–1729)
 Prince Heinrich XXIV Reuss of Köstritz (1855–1910)
 Hans Helfritz (1902–1995)
 Barbara Heller (born 1936)
 Sigmund Hemmel (c. 1520–1565)
 Fanny Hensel (1805–1847)
 Adolf von Henselt (1814–1889)
 Hans Werner Henze (1926–2012)
 Gerda Herrmann (1931–2021)
 Heinrich Freiherr von Herzogenberg (1843–1900)
 Hans-Joachim Hespos (1938–2022)
 Kurt Hessenberg (1908–1994)
 Moritz Heuzenroeder (1849–1897)
 Richard Bruno Heydrich (1865–1938)
 Werner Richard Heymann (1896–1961)
 Hildegard of Bingen (1098–1179)
 Wilhelm Hill (1838–1902)
 Ferdinand Hiller (1811–1885)
 Wilfried Hiller (born 1941)
 Paul Hindemith (1895–1963)
 Rudolf Hindemith (1900–1974)
 Stefan Hippe (born 1966)
 Karl Höller (1907–1987)
 York Höller (born 1944)
 E.T.A. Hoffmann (1776–1822)
 Melchior Hoffmann (c.1679/1685–1715)
 Franz Anton Hoffmeister (1754–1812)
 Heinrich Hofmann (1842–1902)
 Richard Hofmann (1844–1918)
 Franz von Holstein (1826–1878)
 Gottfried August Homilius (1714–1785)
 Nicolaus A. Huber (born 1939)
 Bertold Hummel (1925–2002)
 Franz Hummel (born 1939)
 Johann Nepomuk Hummel (1778–1837)
 Engelbert Humperdinck (1854–1921)

I
 Artur Immisch (1902–1949)

J
 Georges Jacobi (1840–1906)
 Johann Christian Jacobi (1719–1784)
 Michael Jacobi (1618–1663)
 Salomon Jadassohn (1831–1902)
 Friedrich Wilhelm Jähns (1809–1888)
 Johann Gottlieb Janitsch (1708–c.1763)
 Philipp Jarnach (1892–1982)
 Michael Jary (1906–1988)
 Johannes Jeep (c.1581/82–1644), also known as Johann Jepp
 Gustav Jenner (1865–1920)
 Adolf Jensen (1837–1879)
 Jens Joneleit (born 1968)
 Jens Josef (born 1967)
 Hugo Richard Jüngst (1853–1923)

K
 Bert Kaempfert (1923–1980)
 Robert Kahn (1865–1951)
 Friedrich Kalkbrenner (1785–1849)
 Reinhard Keiser (1674–1739)
 Richard Rudolf Klein (1921–2011)
 Julius Klengel (1859–1933)
 Paul Klengel (1854–1935)
 Karl Klindworth (1830–1916)
 August Friedrich Martin Klughardt (1847–1902)
 Joseph Martin Kraus (1756–1792)
 Johann Ludwig Krebs (1713–1780)
 Peter Anton Kreusser (1765–1831)

L
 Helmut Lachenmann (born 1935)
 Josephine Lang (1815–1880)
 Alexander Ledkovsky (1944–2004)
 Johann Carl Gottfried Löwe (1796–1869)
 Henning Lohner (born 1961)
 Carl Albert Löschhorn (1819–1905), also known as Loeschhorn
 Albert Lortzing (1801–1851)
 Vincent Lübeck (1654–1740)

M
 Theo Mackeben (1897–1953)
 Claus-Steffen Mahnkopf (born 1962)
 Heinrich Marschner (1795–1861)
 Johann Mattheson (1681–1764)
 Emilie Mayer (1812–1883)
 Simon Mayr (1763–1845)
 Rupert Ignaz Mayr (1646–1712)
 Tilo Medek (1940–2006)
 Bernd Meinunger (born 1944)
 Johann Nicolaus Mempel (1713–1747)
 Arnold Mendelssohn (1855–1933)
 Fanny Mendelssohn (1805–1847)
 Felix Mendelssohn (1809–1847)
 Gustav Merkel (1827–1885)
 Giacomo Meyerbeer (1791–1864)
 David Moritz Michael (1751–1827)
 Winfried Michel (born 1948)
 Wilhelm Middelschulte (1863–1943)
 Moritz Moszkowski (1854–1925)
 Leopold Mozart (1719–1787)
 Wolfgang Amadeus Mozart (1756–1791)
 Gerhard Müller-Hornbach
 Johann Gottfried Müthel (1728–1788)
 Johann Daniel Mylius (1583–1642)

N
 Johann Friedrich Naue (1787–1858)
 Johann Gottlieb Naumann (1741–1801)
 Johann Nauwach (1595–1630)
 Hermann Necke (1850–1912)
 Christian Gottlob Neefe (1748–1798)
 Otto Neitzel (1852–1920)
 Sarah Nemtsov (born 1980) 
 Wilhelm Neuland (1806–1889)
 Otto Nicolai (1810–1849)

O
 Jacques Offenbach (1819–1880)
 Carl Orff (1895–1982)
 Caspar Othmayr (1515–1553)

P
 Johann Pachelbel (1653–1706)
 Raimund Pechotsch (1864–1941)
 Johann Christoph Pepusch (1667–1752), also known as John Christopher Pepusch and Dr Pepusch
 Hans Pfitzner (1869–1949)
 Michael Praetorius (1571–1621)

Q
 Johann Joachim Quantz (1697–1773)

R
 Erika Radermacher (born 1936)
 Aribert Reimann (born 1936)
 Carl Reinecke (1824–1910)
 Max Reger (1873–1916)
 Hermann Reutter (1900–1985)
 Rolf Riehm (born 1937)
 Ferdinand Ries (1784–1838)
 Wolfgang Rihm (born 1952)
 Johann Theodor Roemhildt (1684–1756)
 Eduard Rohde (1828–1883)

S
 Theodor von Schacht (1748–1823)
 Christoph Schaffrath (1709–1763)
 Samuel Scheidt (1587–1653)
 Martin Scherber (1907–1974)
 Philippine Schick (1893–1970)
 Louis Schlösser (1800–1886)
 Johann Jakob Schnell (1687–1754)
 Hans Michael Schletterer (1842–1893)
 Dieter Schnebel (1930–2018)
 Arnold Schoenberg (1874–1951)
 Johann Schop (1590–1667)
 Franz Schreker (1878–1934)
 Franz Schubert (1797–1828)
 Clara Schumann (1819–1896)
 Robert Schumann (1810–1856)
 Georg Caspar Schürmann (c. 1673–1751)
 Heinrich Schütz (1585–1672)
 Philipp Scharwenka (1847–1917)
 Fritz Seitz (1848–1918)
 Louis Spohr (1784–1859)
 Carl Stamitz (1746–1801)
 Lena Stein-Schneider (1874–1958)
 Karlheinz Stockhausen (1928–2007)
 Gottfried Heinrich Stölzel (1690–1749)
 Richard Strauss (1864–1949)

T
 Georg Michael Telemann (1748–1831)
 Georg Philipp Telemann (1681–1767)
 Johann Theile (1646–1724)
 Friedrich Hieronymus Truhn (1811–1886)

U
 Anton Urspruch (1850–1907)

V
 Andreas Nicolaus Vetter (1666–1734)
 Johann Vierdanck (c. 1605–1646), also Virdanck, Vyrdanck, Feyertagk, Feyerdank, Fierdanck
 Johann Christoph Vogel (1756–1788), also Fogel
 Friedrich Robert Volkmann (1815–1883)

W
 Max Wagenknecht (1857–1922)
 Ignatz Waghalter (1881–1949)
 Richard Wagner (1813–1883)
 Siegfried Wagner (1869–1930)
 Carl Maria von Weber (1786–1826)
 Kurt Weill (1900–1950)
 Hans Jürgen von der Wense (1894–1966)
 Fred Werner (1850–1920)
 Richard Wetz (1875–1935)
 Jörg Widmann (born 1973)
 Franz Wohlfahrt (1833–1884)
 Hanns Wolf (1894–1968)

Z
 Friedrich Wilhelm Zachow (1663–1712), also Zachau
 Adolf Zander (1843–1914)
 Hans Zimmer (born 1957)
 Hermann Zilcher (1881–1948)
 Johann Rudolf Zumsteeg (1760–1802)

References

See also

 Chronological list of German classical composers
 Lists of composers
 List of Germans

 
German
Composers
Composers